José Silos Franco (Sobreiro, Mafra, 19 March 1920 - Lisbon, 14 April 2009) was a Portuguese potter and sculptor.

He came from a humble family of potters and started developing his artistic style since a very young age. He was influenced both by the popular art of pottery as by more high level clay artists, like Joaquim Machado de Castro. He cultivated also religious art, making many Nativity Scenes.

The greatest accomplishment of José Franco was his "Aldeia Típica de José Franco" ("Typical Village of José Franco"), an open air museum that recreates a village from the Mafra region at the first decades of the 20th century, in Sobreiro.

In his last years, he asked to the Rotary Club of Mafra to help him create a José Franco Foundation and a School for Arts and Works.

His art was admired in Portugal and abroad, by people like actor Raul Solnado and the Brazilian writer Jorge Amado, who had a collection of his works. One of his Nativity Scenes was offered to Pope John Paul II, who blessed it.

References

1920 births
2009 deaths
Portuguese potters
Portuguese Roman Catholics
20th-century Portuguese sculptors
Male sculptors
20th-century male artists
20th-century ceramists